Dascălu may refer to:
 Dascălu, Ilfov, a commune in Ilfov County, Romania
 Balta Dascălului, a tributary of the river Olteț in Romania
 Alexandra Dascalu, French volleyballer
 Mihaela Dascălu, retired Romanian speed skater